Arjan Singh Bhullar (born May 13, 1986) is a Canadian mixed martial artist currently competing in the heavyweight division of ONE Championship, where he is the current ONE Heavyweight World Champion. He has also competed in the Ultimate Fighting Championship.

Bhullar is also a former freestyle wrestler and folkstyle wrestler. As a freestyle wrestler, has represented Canada at the 2007, 2009, 2010 and 2011 World Championships, at the 2010 Commonwealth Games, at the 2007 Pan American Games and at the 2012 Summer Olympics. In folkstyle, Bhullar is a 2-time NAIA Champion and 1-time freestyle CIS Champion from Canada.

Wrestling career

Early life and Folkstyle 
Bhullar was born and raised in Vancouver, British Columbia. He started wrestling at a young age. As a collegiate wrestler, he competed for the Simon Fraser Clan at Simon Fraser University, a NAIA university at the time. He had a successful career while wrestling at 285 pounds, placing third in 2007 and becoming champion in 2008 and 2009 at the NAIA Wrestling Championships. He was also named Canada's Wrestler of the year and NAIA outstanding wrestler in 2009. At the 2009 CIS Championships, Bhullar became the first wrestler to ever win the NAIA and CIS titles in the same year.

Bhullar won a gold medal at the 2010 Commonwealth Games. Arjan represented Canada at the 2012 London Summer Olympics. Giving back to wrestling, Arjan is one of the founding coaches of the University of the Fraser Valley varsity wrestling program.  The UFV Cascades compete in the CIS.

Freestyle career 
For five years, Bhullar was a member of the Canadian National Team and was also the National Champion since 2008 to 2012 at 120 kilograms. In 2006, Bhullar placed third at the World University Championships. In 2007, he won a bronze medal at the Pan American Games and competed at the World Championships. He competed again at the World Championships in 2009 and 2010, in the latter year he also won the championship at 120 kg of the Commonwealth Games. In 2012 he became the first Canadian wrestler with South Asian ethnicity to represent the National Freestyle Wrestling Team at the Summer Olympics. He ended up placing 13th.

Coaching 
Bhullar was one of the founding coaches of the UFV Cascades wrestling team at University of the Fraser Valley. He is also a member of his family's training center; Bhullar Wrestling Club.

Mixed martial arts career

Early career
In August 2014, Bhullar had his first amateur fight as a mixed martial artist. He turned pro in November of that year fighting with the Battlefield Fight League. Over the next few years, Bhullar competed exclusively in his native Canada and remained undefeated with a record of six wins.  Arjan won the vacant BFL Heavyweight Title with a victory over Blake Nash on October 17, 2015.  He has defended the title twice.

Ultimate Fighting Championship
In May 2017, Bhullar signed with the Ultimate Fighting Championship becoming the first fighter of Indo-Canadian descent to sign with the company.

Bhullar made his promotional debut at UFC 215 on September 9, 2017, against Luis Henrique. He won the fight via unanimous decision.

Bhullar's next fight was against Adam Wieczorek on April 14, 2018, at UFC on Fox 29. After controlling the first round with his wrestling, Bhullar would eventually get caught with an omoplata early in the second round, officially losing the fight via submission at 1:59 of round 2.

For his third fight with the promotion, Bhullar faced Marcelo Golm on October 27, 2018, at UFC Fight Night 138. He won the fight via unanimous decision.

Bhullar next faced Juan Adams on May 4, 2019, at UFC Fight Night 151. He won the fight by unanimous decision. The fight marked the last fight of his prevailing contract with the UFC.

ONE Championship
On July 3, 2019, it was announced that Bhullar signed a deal with Asia-based MMA promotion ONE Championship, and was expected to make his promotional debut against Mauro Cerilli at ONE Championship: Dawn of Heroes on August 2, 2019. However, Cerilli pulled out of the bout due to staph infection and the fight was cancelled. The fight eventually took place at ONE Championship: Century on October 13, 2019, with Bhullar winning by unanimous decision.

ONE Championship Heavyweight Championship
On February 1, 2020, it was announced that Bhullar would be challenging Brandon Vera for the ONE Heavyweight World Championship at ONE Championship: Code of Honor on May 29, 2020, but the duel was canceled due to the COVID-19 pandemic. The bout was rebooked to take place at ONE Championship: Dangal on May 15, 2021. He defeated Vera via second-round technical knockout to win the ONE Heavyweight World Championship, becoming the first fighter of Indian descent to win an MMA world title.

After a contract dispute, Bhullar eventually signed a new contract with the organization and is expected to defend his belt in a unification bout in the summer of 2022.

Bhullar was scheduled to face interim champion Anatoly Malykhin for the ONE Heavyweight World Championship unification bout at ONE 161 on September 29, 2022. However,  Bhullar withdraw due to suffering an injury in training, It was announced that Bhullar had surgery on the arm two weeks ago and the bout was cancelled. The pair was rescheduled on March 25, 2023, at ONE Fight Night 8. In turn, the bout was removed from the event due to a shift in broadcaster commitments and the bout will be rescheduled to a card later this year, which will be announced in the near future.

Personal life
Bhullar is of Indian Punjabi Sikh descent.

Through his MMA career, Bhullar has developed a friendship with pro-wrestler, former WWE champion and fellow Indo-Canadian Jinder Mahal.

Championships and achievements

Mixed martial arts
ONE Championship
ONE Heavyweight World Championship (one time, current)
Battlefield Fight League
BFL Heavyweight Championship (one time)

Freestyle wrestling 

 United World Wrestling
 2012 Germany Grand Prix Gold Medalist
 2012 Pan American Olympic Qualification Tournament Gold Medalist
 2010 Commonwealth Games Gold Medalist
 2007 Pan American Games Bronze Medalist
 2006 World University Championships Bronze Medalist
 2005 World Junior Championships - 5th place
 2004 Pan American Championships Gold Medalist
 Wrestling Canada Lutte
 2012 Canadian Olympic Team Member
 2012 Canadian Senior National Champion
 2011 Canadian Senior World Team Member
 2011 Canadian Senior National Champion
 2010 Canadian Senior World Team Member
 2010 Canadian Senior National Champion
 2009 Canadian Senior Wrestler of the Year
 2009 Canadian Senior World Team Member
 2009 Canadian Senior National Champion
 2008 Canadian Senior National Champion
 2007 Canadian Senior World Team Member
 2006 Canadian Junior National Champion
 2006 Canadian Junior World Team Member
 2005 Canadian Junior National Champion
 2005 Canadian Junior World Team Member

Collegiate wrestling
 National Association of Intercollegiate Athletics
NAIA Outstanding Wrestler (2009)
NAIA 285 lb National Champion out of Simon Fraser University  (2009)
NAIA 285 lb National Champion out of Simon Fraser University  (2008)
NAIA 285 lb National 3rd Place out of Simon Fraser University  (2007)
 Canadian Interuniversity Sport
CIS 130 kg National Champion out of Simon Fraser University  (2009)

Mixed martial arts record

|-
|Win
|align=center|11–1
| Brandon Vera
|TKO (punches)
|ONE: Dangal
|
|align=center|2
|align=center|4:27 
|Kallang, Singapore
|
|-
|Win
|align=center|10–1
|Mauro Cerilli
|Decision (unanimous)
|ONE: Century Part 2
|
|align=center|3
|align=center|5:00
|Tokyo, Japan
| 
|-
|Win
|align=center|9–1
|Juan Adams
|Decision (unanimous)
|UFC Fight Night: Iaquinta vs. Cowboy 
|
|align=center|3
|align=center|5:00
|Ottawa, Ontario, Canada
|  
|-
|Win
|align=center|8–1
|Marcelo Golm
|Decision (unanimous)
|UFC Fight Night: Volkan vs. Smith 
|
|align=center|3
|align=center|5:00
|Moncton, New Brunswick, Canada
|
|-
|Loss
|align=center|7–1
|Adam Wieczorek
|Submission (omoplata)
|UFC on Fox: Poirier vs. Gaethje
|
|align=center|2
|align=center|1:59
|Glendale, Arizona, United States
|
|-
|Win
|align=center| 7–0
|Luis Henrique
|Decision (unanimous)
|UFC 215 
|
|align=center|3
|align=center|5:00
|Edmonton, Alberta, Canada
|
|-
|Win
|align=center| 6–0
|Joe Yager
|Decision (unanimous)
|Battlefield Fight League 48
|April 29, 2017
|align=center|3
|align=center|5:00
|Coquitlam, British Columbia, Canada
|
|-
|Win
|align=center| 5–0
|Chris Catala
|TKO (punches)
|Hard Knocks 51
|October 14, 2016
|align=center|1
|align=center|4:29
|Calgary, Alberta, Canada	
|
|-
|Win
|align=center| 4–0
|Ryan Pokryfky
|Decision (unanimous)
|Battlefield Fight League 45 
|September 17, 2016
|align=center|5
|align=center|5:00
|Coquitlam, British Columbia, Canada
|
|-
|Win
|align=center| 3–0
|Blake Nash
|TKO (doctor stoppage)
|Battlefield Fight League 39 
|October 17, 2015
|align=center|2
|align=center|5:00
|Coquitlam, British Columbia, Canada
|
|-
|Win
|align=center| 2–0
|Jon-Taine Hall
|Decision (unanimous)
|Hard Knocks 44
|June 28, 2015
|align=center|3
|align=center|5:00
|Calgary, Alberta, Canada	
|
|-
|Win
|align=center| 1–0
|Adam Santos
|TKO (punches)
|Battlefield Fight League 33
|November 7, 2014
|align=center|3
|align=center|2:22
|Coquitlam, British Columbia, Canada
|

See also 

 List of current ONE fighters

References

External links
 
 
Wrestling Canada profile

1986 births
Living people
Canadian Sikhs
Canadian male mixed martial artists
Mixed martial artists utilizing collegiate wrestling
Mixed martial artists utilizing freestyle wrestling
Canadian people of Indian descent
Commonwealth Games gold medallists for Canada
Wrestlers at the 2007 Pan American Games
Wrestlers at the 2010 Commonwealth Games
Wrestlers at the 2012 Summer Olympics
Olympic wrestlers of Canada
People from Richmond, British Columbia
Sportspeople from British Columbia
Canadian male sport wrestlers
Pan American Games bronze medalists for Canada
Commonwealth Games medallists in wrestling
Pan American Games medalists in wrestling
Ultimate Fighting Championship male fighters
Medalists at the 2007 Pan American Games
ONE Championship champions
Medallists at the 2010 Commonwealth Games
University of the Fraser Valley people